is an underground railway station on the Minatomirai Line in Nishi-ku, Yokohama, Kanagawa Prefecture, Japan, operated by the third-sector railway operating company Yokohama Minatomirai Railway.

Lines
Trains through-run to and from the Tokyu Toyoko Line from Shibuya Station and beyond on the Tokyo Metro Fukutoshin Line and Tobu Tojo Line and Seibu Ikebukuro Line.

Station layout
Shin-Takashima Station is an underground station with two side platforms serving two tracks. It is the deepest underground of any station on the Minatomirai Line.

Platforms

History
Shin-Takashima Station opened on 1 February 2004, coinciding with the opening of the Minatomirai Line.

This was the last station on the Minatomirai Line to begin operation of platform screen doors. The devices were installed and became operational on 6 November 2021.

Passenger statistics
In fiscal 2011, the station was used by an average of 5,144 passengers daily.

Surrounding area
 Nissan Motors global headquarters
 Marinos Town
 Hara Model Railway Museum

References

External links

  

Railway stations in Kanagawa Prefecture
Railway stations in Yokohama
Railway stations in Japan opened in 2004